Kelilalina is a town and commune in Madagascar. It belongs to the district of Ifanadiana, which is a part of Vatovavy. This municipality has a population of 10,747 inhabitants in 2018.

Only primary schooling is available. The majority 98.95% of the population of the commune are farmers.  The most important crop is rice, while other important products are bananas, coffee and cassava. Services provide employment for 1.05% of the population.

Rivers
The Namorona River flows by this town.

References

Populated places in Vatovavy